"Cool, Cool Water" is a song by the American rock band the Beach Boys from their 1970 album Sunflower. It was written by Brian Wilson and Mike Love and later issued as an A-sided single in March 1971.

The song evolved from "Love to Say Dada", an unfinished composition from the band's cancelled Smile album. Earlier versions of "Cool, Cool Water" were recorded during sessions for the 1967 albums Smiley Smile and Wild Honey. At the insistence of A&R man Lenny Waronker, the song was completed for Sunflower, with Moog synthesizer contributions from Beaver & Krause.

Brian Wilson described "Cool, Cool Water" as "one of my very, very favorite songs that we ever did."

Background
Engineer Stephen Desper stated that Brian Wilson had been obsessed with the riff of "Cool, Cool Water" for years prior to its release,  and that the song had evolved from an earlier composition, "I Love to Say Dada". Wilson was quoted in the liner notes of a 2000 CD reissue:

Recording
Recording sessions for "Cool, Cool Water" were held in June and October 1967, during the making of the Smiley Smile and Wild Honey albums. The song was listed as part of a proposed Wild Honey track listing dated October 13, 1967. It was ultimately excluded from the album.

In 1969, Lenny Waronker, then an A&R executive at Warner Music, heard the unfinished tape, and convinced Wilson to finish the track for Sunflower. Waronker was impressed with the song's inspired simplicity and stated "If I ever get the opportunity to produce Brian, I'd encourage him to do something that combined the vividness of 'Good Vibrations' with the non-commercial gentleness of 'Cool, Cool Water'."

A revised version of "Cool, Cool Water" was released on the band's 1970 album Sunflower, featuring new lyrics by Mike Love and an altered arrangement. Desper commented on Carl Wilson's role in the completion of "Cool, Cool Water" in a 2012 post,

Wilson later said: "In 'Cool, Cool Water' there's a chant I wish we hadn't used. It fits all right, but there's just something I don't think is quite right with it." The chant also features as the intro to the Brian Wilson Presents Smile version of "Love to Say Dada" (renamed "In Blue Hawaii").

Alternate edits
 In March 1971, "Cool, Cool Water" was released as an edited single, with the B-side of the single being "Forever". The truncated single edit was included on the group's 2007 compilation The Warmth of the Sun.
 In 2021, the compilation Feel Flows included an alternate edit prepared by Mark Linett. His colleague Alan Boyd explained, "it’s the exact same multi-track masters that they used, but putting an emphasis on different vocal parts than were used in the version on the original album."

Personnel
Sourced from Craig Slowinski.
The Beach Boys
 Al Jardine – harmony and backing vocals, group vocals, guitar, finger snaps
 Bruce Johnston – harmony and backing vocals, group vocals, finger snaps
 Mike Love – lead vocals, harmony and backing vocals, group vocals, finger snaps
 Brian Wilson – lead vocals, harmony and backing vocals, group vocals, piano, organ, Moog water drop effects, finger snaps, production
 Carl Wilson – harmony and backing vocals, group vocals, guitar, bass, finger snaps
 Dennis Wilson – group vocals, tom-tom, bongos, finger snaps
Additional musicians and production staff
 Stephen Desper – Moog bass, Moog wave effects, Moog programming, engineer
 Paul Beaver – Moog programming
 Bernard Krause – Moog programming
 Jim Lockert – engineer
 Bill Halverson – engineer

References
Notes

Citations

Bibliography

External links
 
 
 
 
 
 
 

1971 singles
1970 songs
The Beach Boys songs
Songs written by Brian Wilson
Songs written by Mike Love
Song recordings produced by Brian Wilson
Reprise Records singles